"Dragonstone" is the first episode of the seventh season of HBO's medieval fantasy television series Game of Thrones, and the 61st overall. The seventh season premiere, the episode was written by series co-creators David Benioff and D. B. Weiss, and directed by Jeremy Podeswa. It first aired on HBO on July 16, 2017.

The episode's main plot focuses on Daenerys Targaryen's long-awaited homecoming to Westeros at Dragonstone with her vast forces, and Cersei and Jaime Lannister meeting with Euron Greyjoy for an alliance after the demise of House Frey. Other plotlines include Bran Stark and Meera Reed arriving at the Wall, Jon Snow making preparations to fight the Army of the Dead, and Samwell Tarly searching for information at Oldtown. The episode received positive reviews from critics, who considered Arya's revenge on House Frey, Sandor Clegane's atonement for his old life, and Daenerys's dramatic homecoming to Dragonstone as highlights of the episode; however, a cameo appearance by singer Ed Sheeran received criticism. In the United States, the episode achieved a viewership of 10.11 million in its initial broadcast.

This episode marks the final appearance of David Bradley (Walder Frey).

Plot

In the Riverlands
Disguised as Walder Frey, Arya Stark kills all the men of House Frey with poisoned wine, avenging the Red Wedding ("The Rains of Castamere"). Arya proceeds south to assassinate Queen Cersei Lannister, and makes camp with friendly Lannister soldiers.

Sandor Clegane and the Brotherhood without Banners take shelter in the farm Sandor once robbed ("Breaker of Chains"); the farmer and his daughter are long dead inside. Beric Dondarrion admits he does not know why he has been repeatedly resurrected. Thoros of Myr shows Sandor a vision in the flames of White Walkers passing a mountain that looks like an arrowhead, on the march to Eastwatch-by-the-Sea. At night, Sandor buries the bodies. Discovering him, Thoros helps.

Beyond the Wall
Bran Stark and Meera Reed arrive at the Wall. Eddison Tollett is initially suspicious of them, but lets them in when Bran reveals his knowledge of the attack at Hardhome ("Hardhome"). Meanwhile, the White Walkers and wights march south.

At Winterfell
Jon Snow forgives Alys Karstark and Ned Umber for their fathers' betrayals of House Stark in favor of House Bolton, despite Sansa Stark's objections, and they swear their loyalty to him. Jon orders Tormund Giantsbane and the wildlings to fortify the Wall at Eastwatch-by-the-Sea, and all Northerners of age to train for battle. In private, Jon is frustrated that Sansa questioned his actions, but Sansa tells him that she doesn't want Jon to repeat the mistakes for which Ned and Robb Stark died. A message from Cersei orders Jon to swear loyalty to her; Jon believes her army poses no threat to them during winter, but Sansa refuses to underestimate her.

Sansa rejects Littlefinger's attempts to ingratiate himself with her. She tells Brienne of Tarth, however, that she can't dismiss him outright because they need the Vale's military support.

In King's Landing
Cersei learns that Daenerys Targaryen will return to Westeros soon, and realizes she and Jaime Lannister have very few allies. Euron Greyjoy arrives in King's Landing offering Cersei an alliance and marriage. Cersei accepts the alliance but rejects Euron because he is untrustworthy, but Euron promises to win her over with a priceless gift.

In Oldtown
Archmaester Ebrose denies Samwell Tarly access to the library's restricted area; Ebrose believes in the White Walkers, but trusts the Wall will halt their march. Sam sneaks in at night and steals a few books. He learns of a very large dragonglass deposit under Dragonstone, and informs Jon.

Sam encounters Jorah Mormont, who is a patient in isolation due to his greyscale. Jorah asks if Daenerys has arrived in Westeros, but Sam doesn't know.

On Dragonstone
Daenerys and her fleet arrive at Dragonstone. After she and her advisors enter the castle, she sees the throne her ancestors built, enters the war room with Tyrion and asks, “Shall we begin?”

Production

Writing

"Dragonstone" was written by the series' creators, David Benioff and D. B. Weiss. The conversation between Jon Snow and Sansa Stark shows Sansa's lingering resentment that she has been insufficiently credited for securing the alliance with the Vale, and also highlights Jon and Sansa's respective, differing identification of the White Walkers and Cersei as primary threats. The dialogue between Jaime and Cersei emphasizes that, with her children dead, Cersei is morally unconstrained and lacks Daenerys's concern for innocents. The writers deliberately excluded dialogue from the scene of Daenerys's arrival at Dragonstone, to preserve the gravitas of that moment.

Casting

"Dragonstone" saw the introduction of Jim Broadbent as Archmaester Ebrose at the Citadel. His casting in the series was initially announced by HBO to Entertainment Weekly in August 2016, and at the time was only revealed as a "significant" role in the seventh season. In a subsequent interview, Broadbent revealed his role in the series, and that he would be sharing his scenes with John Bradley, who portrays Samwell Tarly.

Prior to the episode airing, it was announced that musician Ed Sheeran would be making a cameo appearance at some point during the season. According to David Benioff, they had been trying for years to get him onto the show as a surprise for Maisie Williams, who portrays Arya Stark in the series and is a fan of Sheeran. Before the episode's official release, Sheeran stated about his appearance that "Nothing exciting happens in this scene, we just have a conversation and that's kind of it." In "Dragonstone", Sheeran portrays a Lannister soldier, who Arya happens upon when she hears him singing a song that is unfamiliar to her. The song originates from George R. R. Martin's A Song of Ice and Fire book series, which the television series is adapted from, and is titled "Hands of Gold". In the book series, it is sung by a character known as Symon Silver Tongue, a character unrelated to Sheeran's portrayal.

Filming

"Dragonstone" was directed by Jeremy Podeswa. He joined the series as a director in the fifth season, his first episode being "Kill the Boy", which was followed by "Unbowed, Unbent, Unbroken", for which he was nominated for an Emmy Award for Outstanding Directing for a Drama Series. He further directed two more episodes in the series' sixth season, and also directed the seventh season's finale episode. In an interview with The Hollywood Reporter following the airing of "Dragonstone", Podeswa discussed his experience with directing Ed Sheeran's cameo appearance, stating "He was lovely to work with. He was lovely on the show. I think he fit right into that world." He continued by noting that Sheeran requested to change the key of the song that he performs in the scene during the episode's filming.

Podeswa also discussed his direction for the cold open, saying he wanted to "honor the great writing", and praised Maisie Williams and David Bradley's performance as Arya Stark and Walder Frey respectively, stating "As we got more into it, you knew the audience would have questions coming right into the scene, knowing Walder Frey is dead. So, what is this? Is it a flashback? Is there something else going on here? It's about playing that line of audience surprise and curiosity and how they read the scene. David's performance is so fantastic where there's a moment you can almost feel Arya inside of him. It's even before the dialogue betrays who he is." The scene was not written as a cold open; Benioff and Weiss made that decision on the strength of Bradley's work. Following the cold open, Podeswa also spoke about directing the opening scene following the title sequence, revealing "We knew it would be one shot. Nothing fancy in terms of camerawork. But it's a shot that very slowly reveals itself over time, and we take that time. Then it was a matter of me conceptualizing it with the storyboard artists and visual effects department." Podeswa also stated that the scene ending on the eye of the giant wight was not originally in the script, but came from working with the art department for the series.

Benioff and Weiss praised Rory McCann's acting in showing the torment and guilt experienced by Sandor Clegane; Weiss identified Clegane's discovery of the farm family's unpleasant deaths as a favorite scene in the episode.

In discussing the montage of Samwell Tarly at the Citadel, Podeswa noted that his past experience with directing a montage sequence of Arya while she is washing bodies at the House of Black and White may have been the reason for the showrunners to have included it in the episode, saying "In David and Dan's minds, they made a connection between me and montages, even though tonally these two are very different." He also divulged that the original version of the montage was "about seven or eight minutes" due to the amount of material that Podeswa had directed, and that the final version was edited down significantly.

For the closing scene of Daenerys Targaryen arriving at Dragonstone, Podeswa noted that very little of the scene was shot on a sound stage, but rather on location, saying "The only thing shot on stage were the gates at the top of the stairs that leads to the long winding pathway up to the castle. Everything else was shot on location, in a number of different locations: Zumaia Beach in Spain is where she lands and walks up the stairs and gets to where the gates are. Another place — San Juan — is the place where that amazing staircase that doesn't look real and looks like a CG creation, but it's not, that's a spectacular location going up to Dragonstone castle." The interiors of Dragonstone, however, were all shot on a sound stage, with set designer Deb Riley creating the throne room, and redesigning the map room for the episode.

Reception

Ratings
"Dragonstone" was viewed by 16.1 million total viewers, including 10.11 million on its initial viewing on HBO and the remaining coming from DVR and streaming, making it the most watched episode in the series' history up to that point. The episode also acquired a 4.7 rating in the 18–49 demographic. The episode inspired 2.4 million tweets during the time it aired, making it the show's most-tweeted episode yet. The episode was pirated 90 million times in the first three days since it aired. In the United Kingdom, the episode was viewed by 3.495 million viewers on Sky Atlantic during its Simulcast, making it the highest-rated broadcast that week. On August 2, 2017, HBO announced that the episode was about to surpass 30 million U.S. viewers across all of the network's domestic platforms. In the UK, the episode received up to 4.7 million viewers after seven days, making it the highest for any program ever on Sky Atlantic.

Critical reception

"Dragonstone" has received widespread praise from critics. It has a 93% rating on the review aggregator website Rotten Tomatoes from 45 reviews with an average score of 8.4 out of 10. The site's consensus reads "With a blistering opening salvo, Game of Thrones charts an assured path for its anxiously-anticipated final stretch."

Matt Fowler of IGN wrote in his review for the episode "'Dragonstone' sublimely set the stage for Game of Thrones Season 7 with some righteous revenge, a new alliance, a dramatic (and quiet) homecoming, and a surprisingly great sequence from The Hound as he began to atone for his old life." He gave the episode an 8.8 out of 10. Erik Kain of Forbes similarly gave praise to the episode, writing "This was easily one of my favorite season premieres of any season of Game of Thrones. It's a testament to the show's staying power and quality that even this far in, a season's first episode could be so good. So much of it was just setting the stage, and yet I was reeled in, hook, line and sinker, from the opening moment to the closing credits." Jane Mulkerrins of The Daily Telegraph also praised the episode, writing "One might wonder whether the biggest, bloodiest, most Dragon-heavy show on television would still have the ability to shock and surprise. The answer, happily, is yes." Matthew Gilbert of The Boston Globe said "The season premiere of Game of Thrones was thoroughly satisfying, a transporting hour that brilliantly reestablished the chessboard for the new, penultimate season."

Ed Sheeran received harshly negative reviews over his cameo appearance. He deleted his Twitter account shortly after it. Much of the criticism was around the fact that there seemed to have been no attempt to disguise his cameo – while other artists such as Coldplay drummer Will Champion and Gary Lightbody of Snow Patrol were more difficult to spot in their scenes.

Accolades

References

External links

 "Dragonstone" at HBO.com
 

2017 American television episodes
Game of Thrones (season 7) episodes
Ed Sheeran
Television episodes about mass murder
Television episodes about revenge
Television episodes directed by Jeremy Podeswa
Television episodes written by David Benioff and D. B. Weiss